Zahra Nejadbahram is an Iranian journalist, women's rights activist and reformist politician who currently serves as a member of the City Council of Tehran. She is the first woman to serve as deputy governor in Iran since the Iranian Revolution, having been appointed as the deputy governor of Tehran Province in July 2001.

References

Living people
Iranian women's rights activists
Iranian journalists
Iranian political scientists
Tehran Councillors 2017–
21st-century Iranian women politicians
21st-century Iranian politicians
Year of birth missing (living people)
Women political scientists